Marc A. A. Van Leeuwen (born May 1, 1960) is a Dutch mathematician at the University of Poitiers. He is a project member of the atlas of Lie groups and representations.

Van Leeuwen attended the Utrecht University, where he obtained his doctorate in 1989, under supervision of T. A. Springer.

External links
Website at University of Poitiers

1960 births
Living people
Dutch mathematicians
Utrecht University alumni
Van Leeuwen, Marc
People from Castricum
International Mathematical Olympiad participants